Amel Mekić (born 21 September 1981) is a retired Bosnian judoka.

He won a gold medal at European Judo Championships in 2011, beating five opponents on a way, including two Olympic medalists Ariel Zeevi and Henk Grol.

Mekić was part of the Bosnian Olympic team at the 2008 Summer Olympics (achieved 9th place after four fights) and at the 2012 Summer Olympics (lost in the first round).  He was the Bosnian flag-bearer at both the 2008 and 2012 Summer Olympics.

Although he never managed to win either Olympic or World medal, Mekić beat several Olympic and World medalists during his career, including Olympic champion Pawel Nastula, as well as World champions Frederic Demontfaucon, Dennis van der Geest and Luciano Correa.

Achievements

See also
 2008 Summer Olympics national flag bearers
 2012 Summer Olympics Parade of Nations

External links
 
 Videos of Amel Mekic (judovision.org)

1981 births
Living people
Sportspeople from Sarajevo
Bosniaks of Bosnia and Herzegovina
Bosnia and Herzegovina male judoka
Judoka at the 2004 Summer Olympics
Judoka at the 2008 Summer Olympics
Judoka at the 2012 Summer Olympics
Olympic judoka of Bosnia and Herzegovina
Mediterranean Games silver medalists for Bosnia and Herzegovina
Mediterranean Games bronze medalists for Bosnia and Herzegovina
Competitors at the 2005 Mediterranean Games
Competitors at the 2009 Mediterranean Games
Competitors at the 2013 Mediterranean Games
Universiade medalists in judo
Mediterranean Games medalists in judo
Universiade medalists for Bosnia and Herzegovina
Medalists at the 2003 Summer Universiade